The 2013 Fergana Challenger was a professional tennis tournament played on hard courts. It was the 14th edition of the tournament for men which was part of the 2013 ATP Challenger Tour, offering $50,000 in prize money, and the third edition of the event for women on the 2013 ITF Women's Circuit, offering $25,000 in prize money. It took place in Fergana, Uzbekistan, on 23–29 September 2013.

Men's singles main draw entrants

Seeds 

 1 Rankings as of 16 September 2013

Other entrants 
The following players received wildcards into the singles main draw:
  Sanjar Fayziev
  Temur Ismailov
  Shonigmatjon Shofayziyev
  Pavel Tsoy

The following players entered as an alternate into the singles main draw:
  Daniiar Duldaev
  Dzmitry Zhyrmont

The following players received entry from the qualifying draw:
  Fedor Chervyakov
  Sarvar Ikramov
  Batyr Sapaev
  Yaraslau Shyla

Women's singles main draw entrants

Seeds 

 1 Rankings as of 16 September 2013

Other entrants 
The following players received wildcards into the singles main draw:
  Yana Khon
  Amina Mukhametshina
  Jamilya Sadykzhanova
  Sarvinoz Saidhujaeva

The following players received entry from the qualifying draw:
  Arina Folts
  Tatiana Grigoryan
  Lyudmyla Kichenok
  Alexandra Riley
  Melis Sezer
  Aleksandra Stakhanova
  Dona Valihanova
  Guzal Yusupova

Champions

Men's singles 

  Radu Albot def.  Ilija Bozoljac 7–6(11–9), 6–7(3–7), 6–1

Women's singles 

  Nigina Abduraimova def.  Anastasiya Vasylyeva 2–6, 6–1, 7–6(7–4)

Men's doubles 

  Farrukh Dustov /  Malek Jaziri def.  Ilija Bozoljac /  Roman Jebavý 6–3, 6–3

Women's doubles 

  Lyudmyla Kichenok /  Polina Pekhova def.  Michaela Hončová /  Veronika Kapshay 6–4, 6–2

References

External links 
 Official website

2013 ATP Challenger Tour
Fergana Challenger